Marcus Aemilius Lepidus the Younger or Marcus Aemilius Lepidus Minor (died 30 BC) was a son of triumvir Marcus Aemilius Lepidus and his wife Junia Secunda, a half-sister of Caesar's assassin Brutus.

Lepidus was executed by Octavian, the future Roman Emperor, in 30 BC, as a leader in a conspiracy against him. Velleius says that his wife Servilia committed suicide after her husband's death by swallowing burning hot coals.

Family 
Lepidus had at least one younger brother and possibly a sister. He was likely the son whom his father had once engaged to Mark Antony's eldest daughter Antonia. He sat in the Roman Senate and was married to Servilia, who may have been the daughter of the Caesarian P. Servilius Isauricus and Junia Prima, his aunt.

References

Sources
 Tacitus, The Annals of Imperial Rome
 Suetonius, Lives of the Twelve Caesars, Augustus

External links
 http://www.ancientlibrary.com/smith-bio/0218.html
 https://web.archive.org/web/20090416005759/http://www.ancientlibrary.com/smith-bio/1877.html

Marcus Aemilius Lepidus the Younger
1st-century BC Romans
Executed ancient Roman people
People executed by the Roman Republic
Year of birth unknown
30 BC deaths